Łączna  is a village in the administrative district of Gmina Mieroszów, within Wałbrzych County, Lower Silesian Voivodeship, in south-western Poland, near the border with the Czech Republic.

The village has a population of 140.

References

Villages in Wałbrzych County